Ma Lin, CBE, JP (12 March 1924 or 8 February 1925 – 16 October 2017) was a biochemist and educator. He was the Vice-Chancellor of the Chinese University of Hong Kong (CUHK) from 1978 to 1987. He subsequently served as chairman of the board of trustees of Shaw College in CUHK.

Biography 
1947: Obtained the Bachelor of Science degree from West China Union University
1955: Obtained the PhD from the University of Leeds
1964: Joined the Chinese University of Hong Kong
1973: Became the founding professor and chair of the Department of Biochemistry
1978: Became Vice-Chancellor of The Chinese University of Hong Kong and appointed a non-official Justice of the Peace
1983: Appointed as Commander of the Most Excellent Order of the British Empire
1985-1990: Served as a Member of the Drafting Committee of the Basic Law for the Hong Kong Special Administrative Region
1987: Retired from Vice-Chancellor and establish Shaw College, the fourth constituent college of CUHK
1993-1998: Served as Member of the 9th National Committee of Chinese People's Political Consultative Conference
2017, Lin died in Prince of Wales Hospital in Sha Tin.

References

1924 births
2017 deaths
Alumni of King's College, Hong Kong
Commanders of the Order of the British Empire
Academic staff of the Chinese University of Hong Kong
Vice-Chancellors of the Chinese University of Hong Kong
Alumni of the University of Leeds
Educators from Ningbo
Chinese biochemists
Hong Kong Basic Law Drafting Committee members
Scientists from Ningbo
Sichuan University alumni
Chemists from Zhejiang
Biologists from Zhejiang